The following is a list of episodes from the 1999 animated TV series, Dragon Tales, which ran from September 6, 1999, to November 25, 2005.

Series overview

Episodes 
Dragon Tales consists of 94 episodes, 40 in the first, 25 in the second, and 29 in the third season. There was also a special one-off episode called "Let's Start a Band!" which aired in 2003. Season 1 uses cel animation while all others use digital ink and paint.

Season 1 (1999–2000)

Season 2 (2001–2002)

Season 3 (2005)

Special episodes
There were two special episodes of Dragon Tales, "Let's Start A Band!" (aired in 2003) and "Big, Big Friends Day", the series conclusion.

Unproduced episode
An unproduced episode that was originally going to serve as a pilot episode according to writer Jeffrey Scott.

References

Dragon tales
Dragon tales